Battle Beast is the second full-length album recorded by the heavy metal band Battle Beast, released in May 2013. The album peaked at No. 5 in the Finnish Albums Chart.

Track listing

Literary references
As with Steel, several songs on Battle Beast reference the dark fantasy manga Berserk by Kentaro Miura: "Out of Control", "Golden Age", "Kingdom", and "Fight, Kill, Die". "Neuromancer", meanwhile, is about the William Gibson cyberpunk novel of same name.

Personnel

Battle Beast
Noora Louhimo - lead vocals
Anton Kabanen - lead guitar, backing vocals, production, engineering, mixing
Juuso Soinio - rhythm guitar
Eero Sipilä - bass, backing vocals
Pyry Vikki - drums
Janne Björkroth - keyboards, orchestration, backing vocals, co-production, engineering, mixing

Additional musicians
Joonas Kaikko - percussion

Production
Lucas Lönnross - engineer
Mika Jussila - mastering at Finnvox Studios

References 

2013 albums
Battle Beast (band) albums
Nuclear Blast albums